Doppler is a surname. Notable people with the surname include:

Árpád Doppler (1857–1927), composer, son of Karl Doppler
Christian Doppler (1803–1853), who discovered the Doppler effect
Clemens Doppler (born 1980), beach volleyball player from Austria
Franz Doppler (1821–1883), composer, brother of Karl Doppler
Karl Doppler (1825–1900), composer, flute player, brother of Franz Doppler, father of Árpád Doppler
Werner Doppler (born 1941), German agricultural and economical scientist

See also
Doppler (disambiguation)